Emily Shaffer is an American film actress, dancer, and audio book narrator.

Early life and education
Shaffer was born in Clarksburg, West Virginia. She attended Robert C. Byrd High School, and graduated from West Virginia University with a degree in theater.  Her mother is a catholic school teacher and her father is a lawyer with his own private practice. She has one sister named Hannah.

Career
Shaffer appeared in productions sponsored by Jigsaw Theatre and West Virginia Public Theatre. In 2010 she performed in He’s Coming Up the Stairs at Empire Stage in Fort Lauderdale.

Shaffer got her start acting on television on HBO's How to Make It in America (2011). She was a guest star in the pilot for the NBC series Chicago Med, a spin off of Chicago Fire/Chicago P.D.

She later had theatrical roles at the Gladys G. Davis Theatre and the New York Theatre Workshop. In 2018 she performed in It's a Wonderful Life, staged by Virginia Public Theatre.

Filmography

Appearances in commercials
 Axe Body Spray (TV Commercial)
 Axe Body Spray (print ad) print model
 First Look LXTV (NBC New York) host
 Doritos (TV Commercial) lead talent

Audiobooks narrated
Emily has narrated several audiobooks since 2010.
Blood Promise 2010
Spirit Bound 2010
Last Sacrifice 2010
Bloodlines 2011
Gameboard of the Gods 2013
The Fiery Heart 2013
The Immortal Crown 2014
The Ruby Circle 2015

References

External links
 http://www.emilyshaffer.me/

1986 births
Living people
Actors from Clarksburg, West Virginia
American television actresses
21st-century American women